The San Francisco Maritime National Park Association was founded in 1950 as the San Francisco Maritime Museum Association to operate the then independent Maritime Museum. In 1978 the Maritime Museum was transferred to the National Park Service, and it now forms the core of the San Francisco Maritime National Historical Park.

Today the association supports the National Historical Park. It also preserves and operates, independently of the National Historic Park, the World War II submarine , which is moored at Pier 45 in San Francisco's Fisherman's Wharf area.

External links 
San Francisco Maritime National Park Association website

Parks in the San Francisco Bay Area
Organizations based in San Francisco